Charles Pope (born 22 June 1946) is a South African cricketer. He played in 36 first-class and 7 List A matches for Border from 1966/67 to 1979/80.

See also
 List of Border representative cricketers

References

External links
 

1946 births
Living people
South African cricketers
Border cricketers